The Boscoreale Treasure is the name for a large collection of exquisite silver and gold Roman objects discovered in the ruins of the ancient Villa della Pisanella at Boscoreale, near Pompeii, southern Italy. Consisting of over a hundred pieces of silverware, as well as gold coins and jewellery, it is now mostly kept at the Louvre Museum in Paris, although parts of the treasure can also be found at the British Museum.

History
Located northwest of Pompeii, Boscoreale was the location of a large Roman villa, the Villa della Pisanella, that was buried by volcanic ash following the eruption of Mount Vesuvius in 79 AD. The villa was unearthed during several archaeological seasons, confirming the hypothesis of a villa rustica covering 1000 square metres with clearly defined residential sector and farm buildings. The villa was discovered in 1876, but it was only on April 13, 1895 that the remains of a vaulted box containing the treasure was discovered in the wine-pressing room of the villa.  The box contained silver tableware consisting of 102 items and a leather bag full of coins to the value of a thousand gold aurei. Many items of precious metal were abandoned in Pompeii and its surrounding area by their owners as they attempted to flee the destruction.

Most of the Boscoreale Treasure was illicitly trafficked out of Italy and was later purchased by Baron Edmond de Rothschild. who donated it to the Louvre Museum in 1896. Baron de Rothschild (19 August 1845 – 2 November 1934) was a French member of the Rothschild banking family.  Given the number of the items, their weight over 30 kg, their technical quality and aesthetic value, the silver set from Boscoreale is among the most important and most prestigious sets of this period.

It is assumed that the objects were intentionally hidden in the storehouse before the eruption of Mt. Vesuvius in AD 79. The last owner of the silver set was probably a woman named Maxima – a name written on many of the vessels. A woman was found nearby but there is no definitive answer to the question of whether she is Maxima. It is assumed that the owner of the villa and the entire property is L. Caecilius lucundus, a banker from Pompeii, who inherited the wealth of the Julio-Claudian dynasty in Campania, and that he was the father of Maxima.

Description
The treasure consists of 109 pieces of silverware, as well as gold jewellery (necklaces, bracelets and earrings) and over 1000 gold coins.  Items from the hoard vary in date from the 4th century BC to the 1st century AD. Many of the silver items from the treasure are considered masterpieces of Roman art that could only have belonged to the very elite sections of society. A few objects also seem to be family heirlooms passed down the generations. Parts of the hoard are inscribed with the name Maxima who were perhaps the original owner. Some of the most well-known items in the treasure include:

Skyphos cup of Augustus on a military campaign, seated and surrounded by his lictors and lieutenants as he grants clemency to suppliant barbarians.  The alternate side of the Skyphos depicts Augustus among Gods such as Venus, Cupid and Mars, who represent four conquered provinces.  
Skyphos cup of Tiberius on a triumphal procession through the streets of Rome.  The emperor-to-be rides in a horse-drawn chariot holding a laurel branch and an eagle-tipped scepter.  The alternate side of the Skyphos depicts Tiberius sacrificing a bull in front of a temple to Jupiter.  
Two silver cups decorated with skeletons.  The two silver cups have similar and complementary repoussé decoration depicting the skeletons of tragic and comic poets and famous Greek philosophers, beneath a garland of roses.  
Pair of kantharoi with squatting boar in relief.  
Pair of dishes with relief medallions of the busts of a man and women (although only the bust of the latter survives)
Plate with the central medallion showing the personification of Africa.   In the center is a bust of a young woman wearing an elephant hide cap, holding an asp/cobra in her right hand and a cornucopia of plenty full of fruit in her left. The symbolism of the objects around the woman and her facial features strongly suggest that it is a posthumous portrait of Cleopatra Selene II, Queen of Mauretania, wife of Juba II, and daughter of Cleopatra VII of Egypt, and most likely commissioned by Ptolemy of Mauretania, son of Cleopatra Selene II (shortly after her death in 6/5 BC).  
A polished toiletry mirror with a brilliant reflection, practically this was used to view oneself, the decoration represents the meeting of Leda and Jupiter, turned into a swan, and is a hymn to femininity and sensuality. 
Oenochoe of a goddess sacrificing a bull
Stemless silver cup with gilded central boss and bands of lotus leaves dating from 300 BC

Roman Gold Aurei 

No formal study of the coins was made before they were dispersed into the market and, as is often the case, it is very possible that a list published in 1909 includes material from other finds.

The most recent coin of the Boscoreale hoard dates to AD 79, the date of the eruption. The intense heat from Mount Vesuvius imbued all the gold coins with the beautiful red toning that we now see.

Gallery

See also
Berthouville Treasure
Hildesheim Treasure

Bibliography
D. Strong, Greek and Roman Silver Plate (British Museum Press, 1966)
S. Walker, Roman Art (British Museum Press, 1991)
L'argenterie et bijoux d'or du trésor de Boscoreale : description des pièces conservées au Musée du Louvre - Paris, Leroux éditeur, 1903
Fr. Baratte, Le trésor d’orfèvrerie romaine de Boscoreale, Paris, Réunion des musées nationaux, 1986, p. 35, 65-67 et 91
G. Richter, Portraits of the Greeks, Londron, 1965, I, p. 67, 132 et 138
A. Héron de Villefosse, « Le trésor de Boscoreale », Monuments et Mémoires, Fondation Piot, 5, 1899, p. 58-68, n° 7-8

References

External links
A Visual Tour: A closer look at the Tiberius, Augustus Skyphos

Ancient Greek and Roman objects in the British Museum
Treasure
Silver objects
Greek, Etruscan and Roman antiquities of the Louvre
Archaeological discoveries in Italy
Ancient Greek metalwork